To, Tô, and Tō are a group of surnames of East Asian origin, for each of which "To" (without any diacritical mark) is at least an occasional variant.

Tô is a Vietnamese surname derived from the Chinese surname Su.

From Chinese 陶 (Tao):
 Tô, the Minnan romanization of the name
 To, the Cantonese romanization for the name
 Tō, the romanization of the Japanese surname , which is derived from the (same Chinese) name

Individuals named To 
 
 Johnnie To (杜), a Hong Kong film director and producer
 Kenneth King Him To, an Australian and Hong Kong swimmer
 Marcus To, a Canadian comics artist
 Tô Hiến Thành, a famous governmental officer in the past of Vietnam

See also

Tó, Portuguese nickname
Tô, Vietnamese surname

Surnames